David Ellis (born 11 November 1949) is a former Australian rules footballer who played with St Kilda in the Victorian Football League (VFL). After completing his University studies at La Trobe University he left Victoria to become the Chief Medical Scientist in charge of the National Mycology Reference Unit based at the Adelaide Children's Hospital.

Notes

External links 

Living people
1949 births
Australian rules footballers from Victoria (Australia)
St Kilda Football Club players
Sandringham Football Club players